Marc Millecamps (born 9 October 1950) is a Belgian retired footballer who played as a midfielder.

Club career
During his career Millecamps played for Waregem, with whom he reached the semi-finals of the 1985–86 UEFA Cup, beating Italian club A.C. Milan in the third round.

International career
Millecamps earned six caps for the Belgium national team, and participated in UEFA Euro 1980 and the 1982 FIFA World Cup.

Personal life
He is the brother of fellow ex-footballer Luc Millecamps.

Honours

Player 
KSV Waregem
 Belgian Cup: 1973–74; runner-up 1981–82
 Belgian Super Cup: 1982
UEFA Cup: 1985–86 (semi-finals)
Tournoi de Paris: 1985

Belgium
 UEFA European Championship: runner-up 1980
 Belgian Sports Merit Award: 1980

References

External links

1950 births
Living people
People from Waregem
Association football midfielders
Belgian footballers
Belgium international footballers
UEFA Euro 1980 players
1982 FIFA World Cup players
Belgian Pro League players
K.S.V. Waregem players
Belgian football managers
K.S.V. Waregem managers
Footballers from West Flanders